This is a list of Billboard magazine's ranking of the year's top country and western singles of 1962. 

The year's No. 1 record was "Wolverton Mountain" by Claude King. The record debuted on Billboards country and western chart in May 1962, spent nine weeks at the No. 1 spot, and remained on the chart for 26 weeks.

RCA Victor led all other labels with 13 records included on the year-end chart. Columbia Records followed with 10 records on the year-end chart.

See also
List of Hot Country Singles number ones of 1962
List of Billboard Hot 100 number ones of 1962
1962 in country music

Notes

References

1962 record charts
Billboard charts
1962 in American music